Euzophera climosa is a species of snout moth in the genus Euzophera. It was described by Harrison Gray Dyar Jr. in 1914. It is found in Central America (including Panama) and northern South America (including French Guiana).

References

Moths described in 1914
Phycitini
Moths of Central America
Moths of South America